Nomgon  is an urban-type settlement  in the Saikhan sum (district) of Selenge Province in northern Mongolia. The settlement population is 2,200 (2000).

Populated places in Mongolia